The tuba is the lowest-pitched musical instrument in the brass family. As with all brass instruments, the sound is produced by lip vibrationa buzzinto a mouthpiece. It first appeared in the mid-19th century, making it one of the newer instruments in the modern orchestra and concert band. The tuba largely replaced the ophicleide. Tuba is Latin for "trumpet".

A person who plays the tuba is called a tubaist, a tubist, or simply a tuba player. In a British brass band or military band, they are known as bass players.

History

Prussian Patent No. 19 was granted to Wilhelm Friedrich Wieprecht and Johann Gottfried Moritz (1777–1840) on September 12, 1835 for a "bass tuba" in F1. The original Wieprecht and Moritz instrument used five valves of the Berlinerpumpen type that were the forerunners of the modern piston valve. The first tenor tuba was invented in 1838 by Carl Wilhelm Moritz (1810–1855), son of Johann Gottfried Moritz.

The addition of valves made it possible to play low in the harmonic series of the instrument and still have a complete selection of notes. Prior to the invention of valves, brass instruments were limited to notes in the harmonic series, and were thus generally played very high with respect to their fundamental pitch. Harmonics starting three octaves above the fundamental pitch are about a whole step apart, making a useful variety of notes possible.

The ophicleide used a bowl-shaped brass instrument mouthpiece but employed keys and tone holes similar to those of a modern saxophone. Another forerunner to the tuba was the serpent, a bass instrument that was shaped in a wavy form to make the tone holes accessible to the player. Tone holes changed the pitch by providing an intentional leak in the bugle of the instrument. While this changed the pitch, it also had a pronounced effect on the timbre. By using valves to adjust the length of the bugle the tuba produced a smoother tone that eventually led to its popularity. These popular instruments were mostly written for by French composers, especially Hector Berlioz. Berlioz famously wrote for the ophicleide in his compositions Symphonie fantastique and Benvenuto Cellini. These pieces are now normally performed on F or CC tuba.

Adolphe Sax, like Wieprecht, was interested in marketing systems of instruments from soprano to bass, and developed a series of brass instruments known as saxhorns. The instruments developed by Sax were generally pitched in E and B, while the Wieprecht "basstuba" and the subsequent Červený contrabass tuba were pitched in F and C (see below on pitch systems). Sax's instruments gained dominance in France, and later in Britain and America, as a result of the popularity and movements of instrument makers such as Gustave Auguste Besson (who moved from France to Britain) and Henry Distin (who eventually found his way to America).

The cimbasso is also seen instead of a tuba in the orchestral repertoire. The name is translated from "corno in basso" in German. The original design was inspired by the ophicleide and bassoon. The cimbasso is rare today, but it is sometimes used in historically accurate performances.

Role
An orchestra usually has a single tuba, though an additional tuba may be requested. It serves as the bass of the orchestral brass section and it can reinforce the bass voices of the strings and woodwinds.  It provides the bass of brass quintets and choirs (though many small brass ensembles will use the euphonium or bass trombone as the lowest voice). It is the principal bass instrument in concert bands, brass bands and military bands, and those ensembles generally have two to four tubas. It is also a solo instrument.

Tubas are used in marching bands, drum and bugle corps and in many jazz bands (see below). In British style brass bands, two E and two B tubas are used and are referred to as basses.

Well known and influential parts for the tuba include:
 Modest Mussorgsky (orch. Ravel): Pictures at an Exhibition – Bydło, Night on Bald Mountain
 Richard Strauss: Also sprach Zarathustra, Eine Alpensinfonie, Till Eulenspiegel, Ein Heldenleben 
 Shostakovich: All symphonies, except the Fourteenth
 Stravinsky: The Rite of Spring, Petroushka
 Edgard Varèse: Déserts
 Richard Wagner: Die Meistersinger von Nürnberg, Lohengrin, Ride of the Valkyries, Faust Overture
 Sergei Prokofiev: Fifth Symphony, Romeo and Juliet
 George Gershwin: An American in Paris
 Silvestre Revueltas: Sensemayá, La noche de los mayas, Homenaje a Federico García Lorca
 Gustav Holst: The Planets Gustav Mahler: Symphonies Nos. 1, 2, 3, 6, and 8
 Ottorino Respighi:  Fountains of Rome, Pines of Rome Hector Berlioz: Symphonie fantastique, Hungarian March Paul Hindemith: Symphonic MetamorphosisJohannes Brahms: Symphony No. 2
Anton Bruckner: Symphonies Nos. 4, 7, and 8

Concertos have been written for the tuba by many notable composers, including Ralph Vaughan Williams (Tuba Concerto), Edward Gregson, John Williams, Alexander Arutiunian, Eric Ewazen, James Barnes, Joseph Hallman, Martin Ellerby, Philip Sparke, Kalevi Aho, Josef Tal, Bruce Broughton (Tuba Concerto), John Golland, Roger Steptoe, David Carlson, Jennifer Higdon (Tuba Concerto), and Marcus Paus (Tuba Mirum).

Types and construction

Tubas are found in various pitches, most commonly in F, E, C, or B. The key of a tuba depends on the fundamental pitch of the instrument, or fundamental note in the series of overtones (also called partials) available without any valves being pressed. Tubas in different keys use different lengths of tubing. The instrument has a conical bore, meaning the bore diameter increases as a function of the tubing length from the mouthpiece to the bell. The conical bore causes the instrument to produce a preponderance of even-order harmonics.

A tuba with its tubing wrapped for placing the instrument on the player's lap is usually called a concert tuba or simply a tuba. Tubas with the bell pointing forward (pavillon tournant) instead of upward are often called recording tubas because of their popularity in the early days of recorded music, as their sound could more easily be directed at the recording microphone. When wrapped to surround the body for cavalry bands on horseback or marching, it is traditionally known as a helicon. The modern sousaphone, named after American bandmaster John Philip Sousa, resembles a helicon with the bell pointed up (in the original models as the J. W. Pepper prototype and Sousa's concert instruments) and then curved to point forward (as developed by Conn and others). Some ancestors of the tuba, such as the military bombardon, had unusual valve and bore arrangements compared to modern tubas.

During the American Civil War, most brass bands used a branch of the brass family known as saxhorns, which, by today's standards, have a narrower bore taper than tuba—the same as true cornets and baritones but distinct from trumpets, euphoniums, and others with different tapers or no taper. Around the start of the Civil War, saxhorns manufactured for military use in the USA were commonly wrapped with the bell pointing backwards over the player's shoulder, and these were known as over-the-shoulder saxhorns, and came in sizes from cornets down to E basses. However, the E bass, even though it shared the same tube length as a modern E tuba, has a narrower bore and as such cannot be called by the name tuba except as a convenience when comparing it to other sizes of the saxhorn.

Most music for the tuba is written in bass clef in concert pitch, so tuba players must know the correct fingerings for their specific instruments. Traditional British-style brass band parts for the tuba are usually written in treble clef, with the B tuba sounding two octaves and one step below and the E tuba sounding one octave and a major sixth below the written pitch. This allows musicians to change instruments without learning new fingerings for the same written music. Consequently, when its music is written in treble clef, the tuba is a transposing instrument but not when the music is in bass clef.

The lowest pitched tubas are the contrabass tubas, pitched in C or B, referred to as CC and BB tubas respectively, based on a traditional distortion of a now-obsolete octave naming convention. The fundamental pitch of a CC tuba is 32 Hz, and for a BB tuba, 29 Hz. The CC tuba is used as an orchestral and concert band instrument in the U.S., but BB tubas are the contrabass tuba of choice in German, Austrian, and Russian orchestras. In the United States, the BB tuba is the most common in schools (largely due to the use of BB sousaphones in high school marching bands) and for adult amateurs. Many professionals in the U.S. play CC tubas, with BB also common, and many train in the use of all four pitches of tubas.

The next smaller tubas are the bass tubas, pitched in F or E (a fourth above the contrabass tubas). The E tuba often plays an octave above the contrabass tubas in brass bands, and the F tuba is commonly used by professional players as a solo instrument and, in America, to play higher parts in the classical repertoire (or parts that were originally written for the F tuba, as is the case with Berlioz). In most of Europe, the F tuba is the standard orchestral instrument, supplemented by the CC or BB only when the extra weight is desired. Wagner, for example, specifically notates the low tuba parts for Kontrabasstuba, which are played on CC or BB tubas in most regions. In the United Kingdom, the E is the standard orchestral tuba.

The euphonium is sometimes referred to as a tenor tuba and is pitched in B, one octave higher than the BB contrabass tuba. The term "tenor tuba" is often used more specifically to refer to B rotary-valved tubas pitched in the same octave as euphoniums. The "Small Swiss Tuba in C" is a tenor tuba pitched in C, and provided with 6 valves to make the lower notes in the orchestral repertoire possible. The French C tuba was the standard instrument in French orchestras until overtaken by F and C tubas since the Second World War. One popular example of the use of the French C tuba is the Bydło movement in Ravel's orchestration of Mussorgsky's Pictures at an Exhibition, though the rest of the work is scored for this instrument as well.

Larger BBB subcontrabass tubas exist but are extremely rare (there are at least four known examples). The first two were built by Gustave Besson in BBB, one octave below the BB contrabass tuba, on the suggestion of John Philip Sousa. The monster instruments were not completed until just after Sousa's death. Later, in the 1950s, British musician Gerard Hoffnung commissioned the London firm of Paxman to create a subcontrabass tuba in EEE for use in his comedic music festivals. Also, a tuba pitched in FFF was made in Kraslice by Bohland & Fuchs probably during 1910 or 1911 and was destined for the World Exhibition in New York in 1913. Two players are needed; one to operate the valves and one to blow into the mouthpiece.

Size vs. pitch
In addition to the length of the instrument, which dictates the fundamental pitch, tubas also vary in overall width of the tubing sections. Tuba sizes are usually denoted by a quarter system, with  designating a normal, full-size tuba. Larger rotary instruments are known as kaisertubas and are often denoted . Larger piston tubas, particularly those with front action, are sometimes known as grand orchestral tubas (examples: the Conn 36J Orchestra Grand Bass from the 1930s, and the current model Hirsbrunner HB-50 Grand Orchestral, which is a replica of the large York tubas owned by the Chicago Symphony Orchestra). Grand orchestral tubas are generally described as  tubas. Smaller instruments may be described as  instruments. 

No standards exist for these designations, and their use is up to manufacturers who usually use them to distinguish among the instruments in their own product line. The size designation is related to the larger outer branches and not to the bore of the tubing at the valves, though the bore is usually reported in instrument specifications. The quarter system is also not directly related to bell size, though there is typically a correlation.  tubas are common in American grade schools for use by young tuba players for whom a full size instrument might be too cumbersome. Though smaller and lighter, they are tuned and keyed identically to full-size tubas of the same pitch, although they usually have 3 rather than 4 or 5 valves.

Valves
Tubas are made with either piston or rotary valves. Rotary valves, invented by Joseph Riedl, are based on a design included in the original valve patents by Friedrich Blühmel and Heinrich Stölzel in 1818. Červený of Graslitz was the first to use true rotary valves, starting in the 1840s or 1850s. Modern piston valves were developed by François Périnet for the saxhorn family of instruments promoted by Adolphe Sax around the same time. Pistons may either be oriented to point to the top of the instrument (top-action, as pictured in the figure at the top of the article) or out the front of the instrument (front-action or side-action).

Piston valves require more maintenance than rotary valves – they require regular oiling to keep them freely operating, while rotary valves are sealed and seldom require oiling. Piston valves are easy to disassemble and re-assemble, while rotary valve disassembly and re-assembly is much more difficult and is generally left to qualified instrument repair persons.

Tubas generally have from three to six valves, though some rare exceptions exist. Three-valve tubas are generally the least expensive and are almost exclusively used by amateurs, and the sousaphone (a marching version of a BB tuba) almost always has three valves. Among advanced players, four and five valve tubas are by far the most common choices, with six-valve tubas being relatively rare except among F tubas, which mostly have five or six valves.

The valves add tubing to the main tube of the instrument, thus lowering its fundamental pitch. The first valve lowers the pitch by a whole step (two semitones), the second valve by a semitone, and the third valve by three semitones. Used in combination, the valve tubing is too short and the resulting pitch tends to be sharp. For example, a BB tuba becomes (in effect) an A tuba when the first valve is depressed. The third valve is long enough to lower the pitch of a BB tuba by three semitones, but it is not long enough to lower the pitch of an A tuba by three semitones. Thus, the first and third valves used in combination lower the pitch by something just short of five semitones, and the first three valves used in combination are nearly a quarter tone sharp.

The fourth valve is used in place of combinations of the first and third valves, and the second and fourth used in combination are used in place of the first three valves in combination. The fourth valve can be tuned to lower the pitch of the main tube accurately by five semitones, and thus its use corrects the main problem of combinations being too sharp. By using the fourth valve by itself to replace the first and third combination, or the fourth and second valves in place of the first, second and third valve combinations, the notes requiring these fingerings are more in tune. The fourth valve used in combination with, rather than instead of, the first three valves fills in the missing notes in the bottom octave allowing the player to play chromatically down to the fundamental pitch of the instrument. For the reason given in the preceding paragraph some of these notes will tend to be sharp and must by "lipped" into tune by the player.

A fifth and sixth valve, if fitted, are used to provide alternative fingering possibilities to improve intonation, and are also used to reach into the low register of the instrument where all the valves will be used in combination to fill the first octave between the fundamental pitch and the next available note on the open tube. The fifth and sixth valves also give the musician the ability to trill more smoothly or to use alternative fingerings for ease of playing. This type of tuba is what is most found in orchestras and wind bands around the world.

The bass tuba in F is pitched a fifth above the BB tuba and a fourth above the CC tuba, so it needs additional tubing length beyond that provided by four valves to play securely down to a low F as required in much tuba music. The fifth valve is commonly tuned to a flat whole step, so that when used with the fourth valve, it gives an in-tune low B. The sixth valve is commonly tuned as a flat half step, allowing the F tuba to play low G as 1-4-5-6 and low G as 1-2-4-5-6. In CC tubas with five valves, the fifth valve may be tuned as a flat whole step or as a minor third depending on the instrument.

Compensating valves
Some tubas have a compensating system to allow accurate tuning when using several valves in combination, simplifying fingering and removing the need to constantly adjust slide positions. The most popular of the automatic compensation systems was invented by Blaikley (Bevan, 1874) and was patented by Boosey (later, Boosey and Hawkes, which also, later still, produced Besson instruments). The patent on the system limited its application outside of Britain, and to this day, tubas with compensating valves are primarily popular in the United Kingdom and countries of the former British Empire. 

The Blaikley design plumbs the instrument so that if the fourth valve is used, the air is sent back through a second set of branches in the first three valves to compensate for the combination of valves. This does have the disadvantage of making the instrument significantly more "stuffy" or resistant to air flow when compared to a non-compensating tuba. This is due to the need for the air to flow through the valves twice. It also makes the instrument heavier. But many prefer this approach to having additional valvesor to the manipulation of tuning slides while playingto achieve improved intonation within an ensemble. 

Most modern professional-grade euphoniums also now feature Blaikley-style compensating valves.

Resonance and false tones
Some tubas have a strong and useful resonance that is not in the well-known harmonic series. For example, most large B tubas have a strong resonance at low E (E1, 39 Hz), which is between the fundamental and the second harmonic (an octave higher than the fundamental). These alternative resonances are often known as false tones or privileged tones. Adding the six semitones provided by the three valves, these alternative resonances let the instrument play chromatically down to the fundamental of the open bugle (which is a 29 Hz B0). The addition of valves below that note can lower the instrument a further six semitones to a 20 Hz E0. Thus, even three-valved instruments with good alternative resonances can produce very low sounds in the hands of skilled players; instruments with four valves can play even lower. 

The lowest note in the widely known repertoire is a 16 Hz double-pedal C0 in the William Kraft piece Encounters II, which is often played using a timed flutter tongue rather than by buzzing the lips. The fundamental of this pitch borders on infrasound and its overtones define the pitch in the listener's ear.

The most convincing explanation for false tones is that the horn is acting as a "third of a pipe" rather than as a half-pipe. The bell remains an anti-node, but there would then be a node one-third of the way back to the mouthpiece. If so, it seems that the fundamental would be missing entirely, and would only be inferred from the overtones. However, the node and the antinode collide in the same spot and cancel out the fundamental.

Materials and finish
The tuba is generally constructed of brass, which is either unfinished, lacquered or electro-plated with nickel, gold or silver. Unfinished brass will eventually tarnish and thus must be periodically polished to maintain its appearance.

 Manufacturers 
There are many types of tubas that are manufactured in Europe, the United States, and Asia. In Europe, the predominant models that are professionally used are Meinl-Weston (Germany) and Miraphone (Germany). Asian brands include the Yamaha Corporation (Japan) and Jupiter Instruments (Taiwan). Holton Instrument Company and King Musical Instruments are some of the most well known brands from the United States.

Variations
Some tubas are capable of being converted into a marching style, known as "marching tubas". A leadpipe can be manually screwed on next to the valves. The tuba is then usually rested on the left shoulder (although some tubas allow use of the right shoulder), with the bell facing directly in front of the player. Some marching tubas are made only for marching, and cannot be converted into a concert model. Most marching bands opt for the sousaphone, an instrument that is easier to carry since it was invented specifically for this and almost always cheaper than a true marching tuba. The earlier helicon is still used by bands in Europe and other parts of the world. Drum and bugle corps players, however, generally use marching tubas or Contrabass bugles. Standard tubas can also be played whilst standing. With the comfort of the player in mind, companies have provided harnesses that sometimes use a strap joined to the tuba with two rings, a 'sack' to hold the bottom of the tuba, or numerous straps holding the larger parts of tubing on the tuba. The strap(s) goes over the shoulder like a sash or sit at the waist, so the musician can play the instrument in the same position as when sitting.

Jazz

The tuba has been used in jazz since the genre's inception. In the earliest years, bands often used a tuba for outdoor playing and a double bass for indoor performances. In this context, the tuba was sometimes called "brass bass", as opposed to the double bass (string bass). Many musicians played both instruments.

This practice was mostly used in the New Orleans jazz scene. The tuba was used most frequently with the Louis Armstrong groups and prominent in the album Hot Five.

In modern jazz, it is not unknown for their players to take solos. New Orleans style brass bands like the Dirty Dozen Brass Band and the Rebirth Brass Band use a sousaphone as the bass instrument. Bill Barber played tuba on several Miles Davis albums, including the sessions compiled as the Birth of the Cool and Miles Ahead''. New York City-based tubist Marcus Rojas performed frequently with Henry Threadgill. Starting in 1955, Stan Kenton made his fifth trombonist double on tuba, namely on ballads to make use of the tuba's distinct warm, enveloping sound.

See also

 Brass instrument valves
 Contrabass bugle
 Subcontrabass tuba
 Sousaphone
 Helicon (instrument)
 List of tuba players
 Roman tuba
 Tuba repertoire
 Tubachristmas (music event)
 Wagner tuba

References

External links

 

 The International Tuba-Euphonium Association
 International Tuba Day
 Tubenet Sean Chisham's popular Tubenet discussion forum
 Brass-Forum.co.uk UK based brass discussion forum
 Brassmusic.Ru — Russian Brass Community
 Tuba/Sousaphone as blues instruments
 More Thoughts on Tuba
 Official site for the annual TubaChristmas concerts

 
Contrabass instruments
Bass (sound)
German musical instruments
Marching band instruments
Orchestral instruments